is a former town located in Mitoyo, Kagawa Prefecture, Japan. As of 2019, the area had an estimated population of 15,294 in 6,048 households and a population density of 271 persons per km2. The total area is 56.36 km2.

On January 1, 2006, Takase merged with the towns of Mino, Nio, Saita, Takuma, Toyonaka and Yamamoto (all from Mitoyo District) to create the current city of Mitoyo and no longer exists as an independent municipality.

Geography
Takase is located in Mitoyo in western Kagawa Prefecture. It borders Mino to the north, Nio to the northwest, Toyonaka to the west, Yamamoto to the south, Chūnan and Kotohira to the southeast, and Zentsūji to the northeast. 

The area contains several natural landforms, including Takase River (高瀬川, Takasegawa), Kuniichi Pond (国市池, Kuniichiike), Iwase Pond (岩瀬池, Iwaseike), and the following mountains.  

Mount Ōsa (大麻山, Ōsayama)
Mount Kotohira (琴平山, Kotohirayama) (also known as Mount Konpira (金毘羅山, Konpirasan)
Mount Hiage (火上山, Hiagezan)
Mount Tōbu (東部山, Tōbuyama) 
Mount Katamuki (傾山, Katamukiyama) 
Mount Asahi (朝日山, Asahiyama) 
Mount Ki (城山, Kiyama) 
Mount Tokami (爺神山, Tokamiyama), one of the Sanuki Seven Fuji (讃岐七富士, Sanukinanafuji)
Mount Onigausu (鬼ヶ臼山, Onigausuyama)
Mount Mayu (眉山, Mayuyama)
Mount Yamajō (山条山, Yamajōyama)
Mount Torigoe (鳥越山, Torigoeyama) 
Mount Jin (陣山, Jinyama)

Neighboring areas 
Within Mitoyo
Mino
Nio
Toyonaka
Yamamoto
Outside Mitoyo
Kotohira
Chūnan
Zentsūji

History 
On March 31, 1955, the five villages located near Takase River - Kamitakase, Katsuma, Hijifuta, Ninomiya, and Asa - merged to become the town of Takase. 

On January 1, 2006, the town of Takase, along with the neighboring towns of Nio, Saita, Toyonaka, Yamamoto, Takuma, and Mino, merged to form the city of Mitoyo.

The Great Shōwa Merger
The following three proposals were considered for the merger of 1955.
An eight village merger consisting of the villages of Kamitakase, Katsuma, Hijifuta, Ninomiya, Asa, Yoshizu, Ōmi, and Shimokatsuma
A five village merger consisting of the villages of Kamitakase, Katsuma, Hijifuta, Ninomiya, and Asa (the merger that was implemented)
A three village merger consisting of the villages of Kamitakase, Katsuma, and Hijifuta

The schools and such of the villages of Kamitakase, Katsuma, and Hijifuta were closely related, so their merger went relatively smoothly. The villages of Ninomiya, Asa, Yoshizu, Ōmi, and Shimotakase, however, had room to consider other frameworks, so the merger had to wait for their decision to be made. Ultimately, the villages of Yoshizu, Ōmi, and Shimotakase merged to form the town of Mino, and the villages of Ninomiya and Asa joined the framework for the town of Takase, creating the town of Takase from the merging of the five villages.

Economy
Takase is known for its agriculture, especially its green tea, onions, peaches, and grapes (New Pione variety).

Education
Takase has five public elementary schools and one public middle school operated by the Mitoyo city government.  It also has one public high school operated by the Kagawa Prefectural Board of Education, as well as one private high school and one vocational school, both affiliated with Shikoku Gakuin University.

Elementary Schools
Katsuma Elementary School
Kamitakase Elementary School
Ninomiya Elementary School
Asa Elementary School
Hiji Elementary School

Middle Schools

 Takase Junior High School

High Schools
Takase High School
Kagawa Nishi High School, Shikoku Gakuin University

Vocational Schools
 Shikoku Gakuin University Vocational School

Public institutions
Takase has one major medical institution, the city-funded Mitoyo Nishikawa Hospital. It is also the location of Mitoyo City Hall and the Mitoyo Police Station.

Transportation

Railways 
 Shikoku Railway Company - Yosan Line

Buses
Mitoyo City Community Bus

Expressways and highways 
  Takamatsu Expressway (Takase Parking Area)

Prefectural roadways

Main local roadways
 Kagawa Prefectural Route 23, Takuma-Kotohira Line
 Kagawa Prefectural Route 24, Zentsūji-Ōnohara Line
 Kagawa Prefectural Route 35, Toyonaka-Mino Line
 Kagawa Prefectural Route 49, Kan’onji-Zentsūji Line

Common roadways
 Kagawa Prefectural Route 218, Saita-Kamitakase Line
 Kagawa Prefectural Route 219, Kanda-Takase Line
 Kagawa Prefectural Route 221, Miyao-Takase Line
 Kagawa Prefectural Route 222, Shimotakase-Takase Line
 Kagawa Prefectural Route 224, Okamoto-Takase Line
 Kagawa Prefectural Route 225, Hagata-Toyonaka Line

Sister cities
 Hapcheon County, South Gyeongsang, South Korea - Sister city since July 13, 1996

Local attractions
 Takase Natural Hot Spring
 Mount Asahi Forest Park
 Mount Asahi Forest Park Folk Museum
 Tokami Park, located on Mount Tokami
 Ōminakami Shrine

Notable people from Takase
 Kinujirō Ishī, founder of Taisho Pharmaceutical Co., Ltd.
 Kimiyo Kurimoto (maiden name: Matsuzaki), former World Table Tennis Champion
 Tadao Maekawa, former governor of Kagawa Prefecture and former president of Kagawa University
 Michiyo Usuki, marimba and sanukite lithophone player
 Keiko Mori, announcer for Nishinippon Broadcasting
 Kokeshi Katsura, rakugo storyteller
 Tsuyoshi Kaji, former straight man of the comedy duo Ice Cream (affiliated with Yoshimoto Kogyo)
 Mokichi Mori, first president of the Western confectionery Takase Yōgashi, who named the company after his hometown

References

External links
  
 

Dissolved municipalities of Kagawa Prefecture
Mitoyo, Kagawa